Pisacani or P'isaqani (Aymara p'isaqa Nothoprocta (a kind of bird), -ni a suffix to indicate ownership, "the one with the p'isaqa", also spelled Pisacani, Pisarane, Pisarone) is a mountain in the Andes of southern Peru, about  high. It is situated in the Tacna Region, Tarata Province, Ticaco District.

Pisacani (P'isaqani) is also the name of a village northeast of the mountain.

References

Mountains of Peru
Mountains of Tacna Region